Vladimir Aleksandrovich Staroselski (– 26 August 1916) was an Imperial Russian official who served as the Governor of the Kutais Governorate from May 1905 to January 1906. A graduate of the Petrovsky Agricultural Academy (ru), he was a known agronomist who had helped stop the spread of phylloxera in Georgia in the 1880s, and was well-known to the Georgian intelligentsia. Appointed governor of Kutais in May 1905 to help with the Republic of Guria peasant revolt, he was asked to help in land reform, one of the key demands of the uprising. He proved too liberal in his dealings, and on the orders of Tsar Nicholas II was removed from his position in January 1906.

References

Bibliography 

 
 
 

1860 births
1916 deaths
Burials at Père Lachaise Cemetery
Politicians of the Russian Empire
People from Chernihiv
Russian agronomists